Sérgio Bernardino (born 23 December 1953), known as Serginho Chulapa or simply Serginho, is a Brazilian football coach and  retired professional footballer who played as a striker.

Club career

São Paulo
Born in São Paulo, Serginho was a São Paulo youth graduate. He made his first-team debut on 6 June 1973, in a 0–0 friendly draw against Bahia, and scored his first goal four days later in a 1–1 draw against Corinthians for the Taça Estado de São Paulo tournament.

In 1974, returning from a loan to Série B side Marília, Serginho became a mainstay at Tricolor, scoring an impressive 18 goals in the 1977 season.

On 12 February 1978, Serginho reportedly assaulted the linesman Vandevaldo Rangel, and was handed a 14-month suspension (he only served eleven), subsequently missing out the 1978 FIFA World Cup (which he was expected to feature). In the 1981 Finals, he received a straight red card after kicking Emerson Leão.

Santos
In 1983 Serginho joined Santos, and was the top goalscorer of both Campeonato Paulista and Série A, both with 22 goals. With the club he lifted the state championship in the following year, scoring 74 goals in 110 matches during his first spell.

Corinthians
In 1985, Serginho moved to rivals Corinthians, joining a team that was known as Selecão Corinthiana due to the high level of quality of the squad. After an above-average campaign both individually and teamwise, he left the club.

Later career
Serginho returned to Santos in 1986, later stating that he took a "sabbatical year" at Corinthians. He would, however, struggle with injuries during his second spell, and subsequently moved to Portugal's Marítimo.

Returning to Santos for a third spell in 1988, Serginho featured regularly before moving to Malatyaspor in Turkey. He went back to his previous club in 1989, and subsequently represented Portuguesa Santista, São Caetano and Atlético Sorocaba; he retired with the latter in 1993, aged 39.

International career
For the Brazil national team Serginho was capped 20 times between May 1979 and July 1982, and participated at 1982 FIFA World Cup, where he played in all five matches and scored two goals.

Serginho further represented Brazil in the 1990 edition of the World Cup of Masters, scoring in the final against Netherlands.

Coaching career
Serginho returned to Santos in 1994, as Pepe's assistant. On 8 March of that year, after the latter's dismissal he was appointed interim manager, and remained in charge of the club until November, being himself sacked after headbutting a journalist. In 1995 he was in charge of União São João, but was relieved from his duties in March.

In 1996 Serginho was in charge of another club he represented as a player, Portuguesa Santista, and took the side back to the first division of the Paulistão. He was in charge of São Caetano in the following year, and returned to Briosa in 1999.

In 2000, after spells in charge of Remo and Araçatuba, Serginho returned to Santos as Geninho's assistant. In August 2001, he was definitely appointed manager, but he resigned shortly after.

For the 2002 campaign, Serginho was in charge of former side Portuguesa Santista. He was still linked to Santos from 2002 to 2004, but was removed from his role as Leão was the manager. Returning as an assistant in 2005, he was also an interim after Vanderlei Luxemburgo's departure.

On 29 February 2008, Serginho was appointed manager of Portuguesa Santista for the fourth time. On 8 August he returned to Santos as Márcio Fernandes' assistant. In July of the following year he became an interim, with his spell being marked by a push in a field reporter after a 3–3 home draw against Grêmio Barueri.

On 23 July 2018, after the departure of Jair Ventura, Serginho returned to managerial duties after nearly nine years as an assistant. He returned to his previous duties after the appointment of Cuca.

Chulapa left his coaching duties at Santos on 3 August 2022, after joining the club's idols programme.

Managerial statistics

Honours

Player
São Paulo
Campeonato Brasileiro Série A: 1977
Campeonato Paulista: 1975, 1980, 1981

Santos
Campeonato Paulista: 1984

Individual
Campeonato Brasileiro Série A top scorer: 1983 (22 goals)
Campeonato Paulista top scorer: 1975 (22 goals), 1977 (32 goals), 1983 (22 goals), 1984 (16 goals)

References

External links
 
 
 
 

1953 births
Living people
Footballers from São Paulo
Afro-Brazilian sportspeople
Brazilian footballers
Brazilian football managers
Association football forwards
Campeonato Brasileiro Série A players
Campeonato Brasileiro Série B players
Campeonato Brasileiro Série C players
Primeira Liga players
Süper Lig players
1982 FIFA World Cup players
Campeonato Brasileiro Série A managers
Brazil international footballers
Brazilian expatriate footballers
Brazilian expatriate sportspeople in Portugal
Brazilian expatriate sportspeople in Turkey
Expatriate footballers in Portugal
Expatriate footballers in Turkey
São Paulo FC players
Marília Atlético Clube players
Santos FC players
Sport Club Corinthians Paulista players
C.S. Marítimo players
Malatyaspor footballers
Associação Atlética Portuguesa (Santos) players
Associação Desportiva São Caetano players
Clube Atlético Sorocaba players
Santos FC managers
União São João Esporte Clube managers
Associação Atlética Portuguesa (Santos) managers
Botafogo Futebol Clube (SP) managers
Associação Desportiva São Caetano managers
Clube do Remo managers
Associação Esportiva Araçatuba managers
Santos FC non-playing staff